Omorgus nigroscobinus is a species of hide beetle in the subfamily Omorginae.

References

nigroscobinus
Beetles described in 1986